USS Wiwoka (SP-250) was a United States Navy patrol vessel in commission from 1917 to 1918.

Wiwoka was built as the civilian motorboat Idylease III in 1912 by Murray and Tregurtha at South Boston, Massachusetts. Idylease III had been renamed Wiwoka by the time the U.S. Navy acquired her from her owner, Mr. Joseph V. Gallagher of New York City, on 25 July 1917 for World War I service as a patrol vessel. She was commissioned as USS Wiwoka (SP-250) on 11 September 1917.

Wiwoka performed section patrol duty in the New York City area for the remainder of World War I.

Hostilities ceased on 11 November 1918, and Wiwoka was decommissioned shortly thereafter—probably in December 1918, because her armament was removed on 18 December 1918. She was returned to Gallagher on 17 January 1919, and her name was stricken from the Navy Directory that same day.

References

Department of the Navy: Navy History and Heritage Command: Online Library of Selected Images: Civilian Ships: Wiwoka (American Motor Boat, 1912). Previously named Idylease III. Served as USS Wiwoka (SP-250) in 1917–1919
NavSource Online: Section Patrol Craft Photo Archive: Wiwoka (SP 250)

Patrol vessels of the United States Navy
World War I patrol vessels of the United States
Ships built in Boston
1912 ships